Honky Reduction is the first studio album by grindcore band Agoraphobic Nosebleed.

Track listing

Personnel
Scott Hull – guitar, programming
Jay Randall – vocals, noise

References

1998 debut albums
Agoraphobic Nosebleed albums